Ernest-François Mallard (4 February 1833 – 6 July 1894) was a French mineralogist and a member of the French Academy of Sciences. He is also notable for his work with Henri Louis Le Chatelier in combustion as applied to mining safety.

See also
Thermal flame theory
Detonation

References

French mineralogists
French mining engineers
Members of the French Academy of Sciences
1833 births
1894 deaths